Melvyn Roy Taylor (born 26 April 1961) is a former speedway rider from England.

Speedway career 
Taylor started his career at Mildenhall Fen Tigers in 1977 before riding in the top tier of British Speedway for King's Lynn Stars and Reading Racers in 1978. In 1980, he reached the Commonwealth final, which formed part of the 1980 Individual Speedway World Championship. He reached the final of the 1980 British Speedway Championship and the 1981 British Speedway Championship, finishing 9th and 12th respectively.

In 1984 he was signed by Oxford Cheetahs who bought him from King's Lynn for £12,000. The Oxford team had returned to the British League and the other signings to start as the top five riders for the season were Hans Nielsen for a record £30,000, Simon Wigg for £25,000, Marvyn Cox for £15,000 and Jens Rasmussen, with Ian Clark and Nigel Sparshott at 6 & 7. After a mid table finish in 1984 he was part of the Oxford team that won the league and cup double during a 1985 British League season. Taylor did not compete in the cup final because he left the team in late August to rejoin Mildenhall. After spells at Ipswich Witches and Rye House Rockets he finished his career at Mildenhall in 1992.

References 

1961 births
Living people
British speedway riders
Ipswich Witches riders
King's Lynn Stars riders
Mildenhall Fen Tigers riders
Oxford Cheetahs riders
Reading Racers riders
Rye House Rockets riders